Pityrodia obliqua is a flowering plant in the mint family Lamiaceae and is endemic to the Kimberley region of Western Australia. It is an erect shrub with hairy stems, wrinkled, egg-shaped leaves and pink, bell-like flowers with purple streaks inside.

Description
The leaves are hairy on both surfaces, wrinkled on the top and with conspicuous veins on the lower side.

The flowers are arranged in groups of between three and seven in the upper leaf axils, the groups usually shorter than the leaves. The stalks of the flowers and the outside of the sepals and petals are densely covered with woolly hairs. The five sepals are joined only near their bases and are glabrous inside. The petals are joined to form a tube about as long as the speals, with five unequal lobes. The four stamens extend slightly beyond the end of the tube, one pair slightly shorter than the other. Flowering occurs from May to July and is followed by a black, almost spherical fruit  in diameter.

Taxonomy and naming
Pityrodia obliqua was first formally described in 1918 by William Vincent Fitzgerald and description was published in Journal and Proceedings of the Royal Society of Western Australia. The specific epithet (obliqua) is a Latin word meaning "slanting", "sideways" or "indirect".

Distribution
This pityrodia occurs in the Kimberley region of Western Australia, where it grows on rocky places in mountain ranges.

Conservation
Pityrodia byrnesii is classified as "Priority One" by the Government of Western Australia Department of Parks and Wildlife, meaning that it is known from only one or a few locations which are potentially at risk.

References

obliqua
Plants described in 1918
Flora of Western Australia]
[[[Category:Taxa named by William Vincent Fitzgerald]]